Glane is a river of North Rhine-Westphalia, Germany. It flows into the Ems near Saerbeck. On its course from near Lienen to the west, it assumes several names: Brookbieke, Lienener Mühlenbach and Ladberger Mühlenbach.

See also
List of rivers of North Rhine-Westphalia

References

Rivers of North Rhine-Westphalia
Rivers of Germany